Sam Hewson (born 7 June 1993) is an English professional darts player, currently playing in Professional Darts Corporation events. He qualified for the 2015 BDO World Darts Championship.

Career
In 2014, he won the PDC Youth Tour England. He qualified for the 2015 BDO World Darts Championship, where he lost to Scott Waites in the first round. He qualified for the 2016 BDO World Darts Championship after Vladimir Andersen was removed from the tournament after being suspended by the Danish Darts Union, where he lost to Peter Sajwani in the preliminary round.

World Championship results

BDO
 2015: 1st Round (lost to Scott Waites 2–3)
 2016: Preliminary Round (lost to Peter Sajwani 2–3)

External links
Sam Hewson's profile and stats on Darts Database

References

Living people
English darts players
British Darts Organisation players
1990 births